Thoracophorus costalis, the furrowed rove beetle, is a species of unmargined rove beetle in the family Staphylinidae. It is found in Central America and North America.

References

Further reading

External links

 

Osoriinae
Articles created by Qbugbot
Beetles described in 1840